The "free" pistol is former and still unofficially used name for the men's ISSF 50 meter pistol competition held at the Olympics. "Free" pistol is used to distinguish between other pistol disciplines (air, rapid fire, standard, sport, military/centre-fire). The competition was first held at the inaugural 1896 Olympics (at 30 metres) and then held at 50 metres (or yards, in 1908) each time that shooting was on the programme (that is, excluding 1904) until 1920. It was dropped from the programme for amateurism reasons from 1924 to 1932, but returned in 1936. It was held again at every Games from then until 2016; the event, which had no women's equivalent, was dropped after 2016 to make room for a mixed team air pistol event as the sport moved toward gender equality. In all, the event was held 24 times. The event was nominally open to women from 1968 to 1980, although very few women participated these years.

A team event was held four times from 1904 to 1920.

Medals

Men

Multiple medalists

Medalists by nation

Team pistol

Men

Multiple medalists

Medalists by nation

References

Free pistol
Free pistol at the Olympics